Matador is a Danish TV series produced and shown between 1978 and 1982. It is set in the fictional Danish town of Korsbæk between 1929 and 1947. It follows the lives of a range of characters from across the social spectrum, focusing specifically on the rivalry between the families of two businessmen: banker Hans Christian Varnæs, an established local worthy, and Mads (Andersen-)Skjern, who arrives in town as a travelling salesman as the series opens, and builds up a large business. The name Matador was taken from the localised edition of the boardgame Monopoly, also the series' tentative English title. In addition, in contemporary Danish a "matador" is often used to describe a business tycoon, in the series referring to the character of Mads Skjern and his craftiness as a self-made entrepreneur.

Directed by Danish film-maker Erik Balling, Matador was the idea of author Lise Nørgaard, who wrote the bulk of the episodes, along with Karen Smith, Jens Louis Petersen, and Paul Hammerich. The series is one of the most well-known and popular examples of Danish television and represents a then peak of longtime development of Danish TV drama by the public service channel Danmarks Radio.

The series has become part of the modern self-understanding of Danes, partly because of its successful mix of melodrama and a distinct warm Danish humour in the depiction of characters, which were portrayed by a wide range of the most popular Danish actors at the time; but also not least because of its accurate portrayal of a turbulent Denmark from around the start of the Great Depression and through Nazi Germany's occupation of Denmark in World War II.

The distinctive and in Denmark celebrated theme tune of the series was composed by Bent Fabricius-Bjerre.

Matador originally aired on DR between November 1978 and January 1982 and has enjoyed repeated successful reruns in 1984-85, 1989–90, 1997–98, 2006–07, 2012–13, 2017-2018 and most recently 2020, for the latter newly restored to High Definition. Individual episodes figure prominently in Denmark's top TV viewing figures of all time, led by episode 9's showing during the series' first rerun on 10 February 1985 with estimated 3,641,000 viewers, followed closely by 3,516,000 viewers watching the series finale during its original run on 2 January 1982; this in a country of some 5 million people at the time.

Additionally, the series has been released on VHS and in 2001 on region 2 DVD. This first edition of 12 separate DVDs with two episodes each has been one of the most sold in the country's history and surpassed a total of 1 million sold copies in 2005. A second 2006 13-DVD box set included English subtitles for a wider audience, with various DVD editions surpassing 3.6 million copies sold by 2013. The series was widely popular in neighbouring Norway, Sweden, and Germany, and it has been broadcast in more than 20 countries worldwide, one of which was Australia, here also widely popular when broadcast on Australian SBS TV in Danish with English subtitles. Mary, Crown Princess of Denmark, born in Tasmania, stated in a TV interview on Australian TV in 2004, that she watched Matador whilst learning Danish.

List and synopsis of Matador episodes

(The English episode titles are taken from the English subtitle track on the 2006 Region 0 DVD collection. Many of the original episode titles are based on Danish puns and expressions.)

Season 1 (1978)

Season 2 (1979)

Season 3 (1980–1981)

Season 4 (1981–1982)

List of characters

Characters alphabetically:

Important characters

The Skjern dynasty
 Mads (Andersen)-Skjern — (1:24) Jørgen Buckhøj- (born 1897) Scion of the Skjern dynasty.
Mads is a stranger who arrives in Korsbæk with his motherless son Daniel as a traveling salesman in 1929. Seeing that the local clothing shop caters only to the interests of the well-to-do, he decides to start his own business, Skjern's Magasin, to provide clothing for the common people. 
Personality: Industrious; almost ruthless businessman who does not "forgive and forget"; a stern and overbearing father who expects much of his son Daniel. As time goes by he becomes increasingly sterner to his son, as he slowly realizes that he will never be ready to take over the family business. Instead he favors his adoptive daughter Ellen, who is doing good in school, unlike Daniel. Because of this, she can get away with almost everything.
When he accidentally finds out about his sons homosexuality, he banishes him from his home. This action almost cost him his marriage to Ingeborg.

As his business grows, Mads, who's originally honest and well-meaning, is corrupted by his growing power and occasionally engages in questionable business practices. Despite his religious upbringing he eventually assimilates into a more moderate lifestyle. His political views are conservative, particularly concerning morals, as he is a firm opponent of abortion, then illegal in Denmark.

 Ingeborg (Andersen)-Skjern — (1:24) Ghita Nørby - (born c. 1901)
Wife of Mads Andersen-Skjern and daughter of Oluf and Katrine Larsen. She is also the mother of Ellen from a previous marriage. She and Mads eventually have a child named Erik. Despite loving to work, Mads insists she tends the house in the style of a proper upper class wife.
Personality: Kind, loving, modern, intelligent; unlike Mads, she is far kinder to Daniel; still, she too turns a blind eye on Ellen's choices as she grows older.
 Kristen (Andersen)-Skjern — (4:24) Jesper Langberg - (born c.1899)
He is the younger brother of Mads Skjern and Anna Skjern. Kristen arrives in Korsbæk about a year after Mads, and eventually becomes director of Omegns Bank, a bank for the lower-class denizens of Korsbæk. When the Nazis occupy Denmark, he becomes active in the Danish resistance movement along with Dr. Louis Hansen.
Personality: An honest man; unlike his brother, he is more willing to overlook class differences and has few social ambitions. He has an on-and-off relationship with Elisabeth Friis, sister-in-law of Hans Christian Varnæs, but after a particularly grim falling-out between them, he marries Iben Skjold-Hansen, which turned out disastrous and they divorce. In episode 23 he finally marries Elisabeth Friis (Skjern).
 Daniel Skjern — (1-6) Kristian Steen Rem; (8-12) Jacob Dalgård, (15) Jim Erichsen; (17-19,21,22,24) Niels Martin Carlsen (born c. 1924)
He is the son of Mads Skjern and his first wife. His father wants him to join the family business, but he displays poor business skills and can't live up to his father's expectations. Instead he shows talent for design and fashion; a field where he later enjoys a certain success and becomes marginally involved in his father's business. Daniel is a homosexual, which is near impossible for his father to accept though Ingeborg and Katrine readily accepts it.
 Ellen (Andersen)-Skjern — (1-6) Helle Nielsen; (8-12) Nynne Ubbe; (15) Christine Hermansen; (17-19,21-23) Benedikte Dahl (born c. 1924)
The daughter of Ingeborg Skjern and her former husband Holger Jørgensen. She is adopted by Mads Skjern. As a talented student, she is soon her father's favourite (Mads), whom he loves more than his own son Daniel. Under pressure from her father, she marries a wealthy businessman's son, because it is a good alliance. 
Ulrik Varnæs is deeply in love with her, but due to unfortunate circumstances their relationship never develop. Eventually she divorces her husband, rejects her father's offer to take over the business and goes off to study dentistry.

 Erik Skjern — (8-10) Kenneth Schmidt; (14) Nikolaj Harris; (21) Lari Hørsted; (24) Jens Christian Milbart (born 1933)
Mads and Ingeborg's youngest child. He is a talented student but despite (or because of) his skills in mathematics, a subject Mads values above anything else as it is a prerequisite for running a business, he also rejects his father's offer to take over the business, as his two elder siblings. Instead he expresses a desire to go on to study nuclear physics.

 Aunt Anna (Skjern) — (15) Kirsten Rolffes
Mads' and Kristen's older sister. She arrives in Korsbæk to attend Daniel's conformation. She is a member of the Inner Mission (a Danish pietist movement), like Mads was. She heavily disapproves Mads's new lifestyle, and his choice of wife. This leads to a confrontation with Mads, where he banishes her from his house.

 Oluf Larsen — (1-24) Buster Larsen
Father of Ingeborg. He is a pig's merchant and very good-natured. He helped finance Mads' business after Hans Christian Varnæs refused to lend him money, alongside the backing Mads got from relatives at home in Jutland. Oluf Larsen and his wife Katrine are certainly wealthy, perhaps richer than anyone else in town, yet they still belong to the "working class" and is looked down upon by the bourgeoisie. He is friends with Røde, Fede and waiter Bolt.

 Kathrine Larsen — (1-4,6-13,15-20,22,24) Lily Broberg 
She is Oluf's wife and is both kind and wise. She manages the majority of the money that Oluf brings home. She invests it in various lands and property, but is very distrustful towards investing in stocks. When Mads ask her to invest in his new bank she refuses but instead offers to give 10’000 kr. to him, his wife and each of his children. (In present prices this will probably be around 400’000 $.) 

When Agnes is planning to buy the building in which she has created her home and business from Katrine, she tricks Mads into betting 200 kr. that Katrine will never sell. When Agnes ask, Kathrine predictably refuses to sell; but when Agnes says that she made a bet with Mads, who didn't think she would sell, and in fact was "dead certain" of that, she is persuaded. Thus Mads loses his first and only bet.

The Varnæs dynasty
 Hans Christian Varnæs — Holger Juul Hansen - (born c.1894) The director of Korsbæk Bank and husband of Maude Varnæs (née Friis), and the father of three children, Ulrik, Regitze, and Helle. He is the elder brother of Jørgen Varnæs.
Personality: Kind, loving and to some extent care-free. For the most part, a competent bank director although his bank tends to look down its nose at those who are not members of high society; though usually a devoted husband, he once had an affair with his much-younger secretary Ulla Jacobsen.

 Maude Varnæs — Malene Schwartz - The wife of Hans Christian Varnæs. Spoiled by her husband. She uses her time as hostess of visits from other high society persona in Korsbæk. It is hinted that she tricked Hans Christian Varnæs into marrying her by getting pregnant with their first child Ulrik. During the war, and especially while rescuing the Jewish banker Mr. Stein, who works in her husband's bank, from the Nazi Jew-hunt, her character changes into a brave woman of action that starts seeing people for who they are instead of through upper class eyes.
 Jørgen Varnæs — Bent Mejding Younger brother of Hans Christian Varnæs. He is a slick lawyer and would-be MP living in the fast lane. His wife leaves him when she learns about his affair with Gitte Graa and eventually his life takes a turn for the worse not least due to his alcoholism and utter inability to live within his means.
 Elisabeth Friis — Helle Virkner - Sister of Maude Varnæs - (born c.1894). Lives with (and in the shadow of) Maude and Hans Christian and tends to their two children Ulrik and Regitze as well as looking after the house. Falls in love with Mads Skjern's brother Kristen when he arrives in Korsbæk. The relationship is broken due to the bad relationship between the Skjern and Varnæs families. During the war she enters the Danish resistance movement together with Doctor Louis Hansen and Kristen Skjern and through that re-enters the relationship with Kristen. Eventually marries Kristen and moves away from Korsbæk and their respective families.
 Ulrik Varnæs — Søren Bruun (child), Jens Arentzen (adult) - (born c.1923) A spoiled child. In love with Ellen Skjern. Impregnates a servant girl while studying at the university and eventually marries her, much to his mother's regret. Is destined to take over the bank from his father.
 Regitze Varnæs — Camilla Hammerich A spoiled child that's well behaved in her younger years, and becomes an independent freedom-seeking woman. While in her tweens she all but rejects her mother due to being denied a puppy because of Maudes pregnancy with Helle. This creates a permanent rift between Regitze and her mother than never fully heals. Becomes rebellious and is said to be involved with a married man in Germany where she moves to work as a censor of German letters.
 Helle Varnæs — Ditte Maria Norup - (born c.1938) A "late arrival" of Maude and Hans Christian Varnæs. Little is known of her fate. She becomes the primary reason for a permanent rift between Regitze Varnæs and her mother.
 Minna Varnæs — Ellen Winther Lembourn - Wife to Jørgen Varnes. Divorces him and destroys his political career, as her father is highly placed in the conservative party.
 Gustav Friis — Finn Storgaard - Elizabeth and Maudes younger brother. Infrequent occurrences in the series. He has political ambitions and takes an interest in Vicki Hackel.

Friends of Varnæs
 Doctor Hansen (Louis Hansen), MD  — Ove Sprogøe - Doctor of medicine, moved to Korsbæk from Funen (speaks a dialect). Is, like Laura, a person that evolves only a little, and is also a de facto centre of the series. He attends all walks of life (being a doctor) and is somewhat snobbish, but also in touch with regular people. Among the conservative upper class in town he is an odd figure because of his political sympathies for the Radikale Venstre. He is in love with Elizabeth Friis, which is made obvious later in the series, and once it is mentioned that he may have been divorced and has a child.
 Mrs. Fernando Møhge (born 1843) — Karen Berg - An elderly lady who is the widow of Fernando Møhge, a grain and horse trader. Mrs. Møhge's given name is never revealed. She is quite eccentric and is somewhat of a town original. Despite outwardly appearing to have little money, she is in fact quite wealthy but very cheap. She and her late husband are considered among the leading citizens of Korsbæk (according to Laura, because the family hasn't moved away from the area in 200 years or so. She is hard of hearing at times, greedy and borderline senile. The Varnæs brothers refer to her as "Tante Møhge" (aunt Møhge) which might suggest that Mrs. Møhge in indeed their aunt (by blood or by marriage), although the Danish word "tante" could also be used as an informal honorary title for an esteemed elder woman. She dies in 1942, aged 99, after an angry encounter with a German soldier.
 Misse Møhge (born 1869) — Karin Nellemose - The chaste, spinster daughter of Mrs. Fernando Møhge. Is tyrannized by her mother whom she pushes around town in a wheelchair, despite her mother's ability to walk (which Misse claims is a miraculous act of will). Following the death of her mother, Misse becomes increasingly odd, even borderline insane, to the point that Mrs. Varnæs secretly admits that she is scared of her. In 1945, Misse marries Teacher Andersen, who dies on their wedding night because Misse locked him out in cold weather after making sexual advances.
 Colonel Ditlev Hackel — Bjørn Watt-Boolsen Pompous, gruff army officer and garrison commandant i Korsbæk. He is rarely seen out of uniform. He belongs to local high society and is the father of Vicki Hackel.
 Consul Emmanuel Holm — Karl Stegger Background character. President of the board at Korsbæk Bank and, along with his wife, a frequent guest at the Varnæs family. Along with Skjold-Hansen he campaigns against Mads Skjern.
 Mrs. Consul Holm — Else Marie Juul Hansen - Wife of the Consul. Conservative to the bone.
Master Jessen (Bricklayer)  — Poul Reichhardt - Upper middle class eventual chairman of Korsbæk Banks board.
 Mrs. Jessen — Bodil Udsen - the very direct wife of Master Bricklayer Jessen. A horrible person who has it in for Jørgen Varnæs and provides, through her husband, Jørgens downfall.

Servants at Varnæs
 Laura Sørensen — Elin Reimer Faithful servant of the Varnæs family through many years. Laura is the de facto centre of the series, as all things somehow passes through her kitchen, the only real place where high and low both appear. She is also the only character that doesn't evolve throughout the series, insisting on maintaining a divide between the classes (born 1890) (she refuses to sit at the table in the last episode, where the Varnæs couple celebrate their 25th anniversary).
 Agnes Jensen — Kirsten Olesen Becomes the matriarch of "the third family". Originally she was a mere housemaid at the Varnæs house. She marries Røde (Red) and settles for a traditional family, but keeps working odd jobs. She eventually becomes an entrepreneur, starts her own business with great success. Towards the end of the series she starts working for Mads Skjern, and it's hinted at that she might one day take over that business, as Skjern's own children want nothing to do with it, and she has insisted on obtaining stocks in the company as part of her promotion. (born 1911)
 Miss Hollenberg — Christiane Rohde - A troublesome maid at Varnæs' house at some point during the war.
 Esther — Birgitte Bruun - A maid at the Varnæs' house. Finds employment at the Skjern's much to Laura's dismay.
 Mr. Stein — John Hahn-Petersen - Accountant in "Korsbæk Bank" and Hans Christian's right-hand man. Very competent yet subtle. He is Jewish and the catalyst of Maude's most significant development, as she is a vital factor in his escape to neutral Sweden during 1943's  rescue of the Danish Jews. Much like Laura he doesn't evolve much throughout the series.
 Ulla Jacobsen — Karen-Lise Mynster - Trainee at Korsbæk Bank. Engages in an affair with Hans Christian that ends very unhappily.

Working class characters
 Frede  "Fede" ("Fatty") Hansen (born 1893) — Benny Hansen - A good-hearted painter. He's a corpulent man who is seen eating in almost every scene he's in. He is a friend of Røde and Oluf with whom he shares a table at the local restaurant. To his friends amusement it is revealed upon Mrs. Fernando Møhges death, that he is the bastard child of the late Fernando Møhge and thus half-brother to Misse Møhge.
 Marie Hansen (Fede's wife) — Kirsten Hansen-Møller - Neutral person who is a friend and eventual employee of Agnes Jensen.
 Lauritz "Røde" ("Red") Jensen — Kurt Ravn Communist railroad worker and later husband to Agnes Jensen. He is often too preoccupied with political work and not spending time with his family. This lack of responsibility towards his family once nearly cost him his son's life, and his marriage. It was during Daniel Skjern's confirmation where Agnes served as a temporary maid that she relied upon him to look after the children. He failed at doing so as visitors from important party members kept him away from home, and in the meantime their oldest son fell in the nearby pond, almost drowning. Later, he is forced to flee to Sweden upon the German invasion of the Soviet Union in 1941.
 Waiter Boldt — Per Pallesen Background character who serves mostly as comic relief and an incurable gossip, which at times turns out to be decisive information for other characters' actions.

Characters in Damernes Magasin
 Albert Arnesen — Preben Mahrt - The second-generation owner of "Damernes Magasin", who is married to Vicki Hackel. Old money, but an inept businessman who shows little interest in running his business or adapting to the times. At the start of the series, he still does well due to owning the only clothing store in Korsbæk, but as soon as Mads Skjern starts a competing store, Albert's business starts to crumble, and goes bankrupt within a couple of years. He dies early on from a heart attack, but is widely reported to have killed himself with either a duelling gun or gas. The fate of Albert initiates the long-running feud between the Varnæs and Skjern families.
 Mr. (Rudolf) Schwann — Arthur Jensen - He has worked his entire life at "Damernes Magasin" and is utterly incapable of adapting to any new situation. He is an extremely proxy snob, who ends up living at Mrs. Vinther's and working as a debt collector until his death. Even though it is never clearly stated in the series, he is a closeted homosexual as he never shows any interest in women and doesn't have a physical relationship with Violet Vinther.
 Miss (Inger) Jørgensen — Vera Gebuhr - Employee at "Damernes Magasin". She is an old maid who is secretly in love with Albert Arnesen, but because she is of a lower class, never acted on her feelings. She despises Albert Arnesen's young wife, Vicki Hackel. She lives a meagre existence for some years, not adapting to any change until she finds a place as a housekeeper for Agnes Jensen.
 Arnold Vinther — Esper Hagen - Modern person who rebels against the society's norms, but not an anarchist. Early on, he changes workplace from "Damernes Magasin" to Mads Skjern's business, much to his mother's (Violet Vinther) dismay. He is a symbol of the transition between old and new. He has high ambitions and is disappointed when Mads promotes him to manager of a minor subsidiary of his business, but learns to see it as an opportunity. He ends up settling nicely with his annoying longtime girlfriend as his wife and their son (conceived out of wedlock).
 Vicki Hackel — Sonja Oppenhagen - A young girl who married the much older businessman Albert Arnesen in order to escape from a strict home. She is a bit of a tease and rather a spoiled brat in the beginning. However, she is the character that evolves the most throughout the series. At the end of the series, it is suggested that she finds a romantic interest in Gustav Friis, Maude and Elizabeth's younger brother.

Characters relating to the Skjern family
 Gudrun — Anne Jensen - Maid and later employed as a saleswoman at Skjerns Magasin (A very large step up in society in then-Denmark).
 Baron von Rydtger — Bent Rothe - Local nobility and a friend of the Skjern Family. He provides the Skjern family with backing both socially and financially. It is suggested that he has a mental, if not a physical relationship with Ingeborg, especially towards the end of the series.
 Baroness von Rydtger — Birgitte Federspiel - Wife of the Baron. Eventually goes mad (upon the German invasion of Denmark). She is of noble German descent.
 Godtfred Lund — Hardy Rafn - Secretary to the city council (administrator - non-political). Has a burdened economy and illegally helps Mads get a building approvement for a factory through bribery and deceit.

Other important characters
 Gitte Graa — Susse Wold – An heiress to the Graa family fortune. She is a loose woman, who likes nothing better than to drink champagne every day, and party the night away. Although she is a wealthy member of the upper class, she primarily uses men to pay for her expensive lifestyle. Quoting Ernst Nyborg "She is like a carousel, bringing joy to all around her. No one should expect to get all the rides, this is Jørgen's problem."  She is the ultimate object of Jørgen's fascination which leads to his ultimate ruin.
 Viggo Skjold-Hansen — Axel Strøbye - Uninhibited local lawyer who buys Jørgen Varnæs' stock in Korsbæk Bank and thus a seat on the board. He finds his way into local high society, where his direct hell-raising approach is met with disapproval - not least by the Varnæs family. During the war he engages in businesses with the German occupiers and makes a lot of money. Immediately after the war he is falsely accused of being an informant to the Germans. During the liberation of Denmark he suffers a stroke that changes his personality to the exact opposite. He is saved by the intervention of Elisabeth Friis and the doctor who carries a lot of weight within the resistance movement. He is married to Musse Skjold-Hansen (the mother of his daughter Iben Skjold-Hansen).
 Musse Skjold-Hansen — Birthe Backhausen Wife of Viggo and source of Viggo's economic resources. She is Nouveau riche through her late father.
 Iben Skjold-Hansen — Ulla Henningsen Daughter of Viggo and Musse Skjold Hansen. Independent, restless young woman. Marries (unhappily) Kristen Skjern. Divorces him at the end of the war. She is hinted at being a lesbian.
 Herbert Schmidt — Paul Hüttel - German poet and refugee who arrives in Korsbæk. He lives with Lauritz and Agnes Jensen for some time before he escapes the German invasion. Vicki Hackel and he are dating for a while, and she remains in love with him for the entire series. He is close to Katrine and Oluf Larsen who takes him in when he can't stay with Agnes and Lauritz Jensen anymore. The character Herbert Schmidt may have been based on Berthold Brecht who actually did flee the Nazi regime and settled down in Denmark for some time.
 Violet Vinther — Lis Løwert - Dance instructor and widowed mother of Arnold Vinther. At first she keeps the company of Mr. Schwann and later Frederik Andersen for a while. She, like Laura, is a character that "connects the dots" and doesn't evolve throughout the series. Late in the series she develops a fondness for alcohol and loose relationship with businessmen.
 Ernst Nyborg — Morten Grunwald Artist who briefly visits Korsbæk. He was once Maude Varnæs' art teacher and attempts to seduce her and start an affair with her while he is in Korsbæk. The affair never occurs as he turns to Gitte Graa, but Maude's feelings were mutual and she acted on them. This experience provides her with a moral excuse for forgiving Hans Christian's affair with an employee.
 Teacher Frederik Andersen — Helge Kjærulff-Schmidt - An older, strict teacher and widower that is freeloading off the single (widowed or spinster) women of Korsbæk and an absolutely unappealing character. He has it in for Mads Skjern's son Daniel. Eventually, he marries Misse Møhge for her money.

Minor characters
 Oscar Andersen — Nis Bank-Mikkelsen - Nephew to Frederik Andersen. Minor role.
 Olsen — Holger Perfort - Waiter at Postgaarden
 Miss Mikkelsen — Hanne Løye - Headmistress of the private school in Korsbæk.
 Lily Lund — Tove Maës - Distressed, helpless wife of Godtfred Lund.

Trivia
 Coined by series writer Paul Hammerich, the name of the town Korsbæk is a portmanteau of the two Danish towns Korsør and Holbæk. Series creator Lise Nørgaard based much of the provincial feel of Korsbæk on her experiences with the town of Skælskør.
 Even though Korsbæk was originally a fictional town, it has been built 1:1 in the Danish amusement park Dyrehavsbakken.
 Matador is also the name of the localized Danish version of the board game Monopoly. According to the series' creator, Lise Nørgaard, this board game served as inspiration for the title of the series. A group of characters play the board game in episode 11, which is set in 1936, the same year the boardgame Monopoly/Matador was introduced in Denmark.
 Matador was broadcast on Bosnian TV during the 1990s Yugoslav wars, allegedly because the theme of a war-struck Denmark related to the Bosnians' situation.
 Matador was shot entirely on 16mm film, as opposed to video. Prior to its release on DVD in 2001, all the master negatives and magnetic sound tapes had to undergo a thorough physical and digital restoration. Technicians spend months restoring the sound score, physically removing dust and dirt from the image negatives with the use of ultrasound, while digitally correcting light, color, contrast, a reddish tint, and holes and tears in the picture. In 2017 it was restored to 1080p High-definition television prior to the series' sixth rerun on Danish TV.
 Karin Nellemose (Misse Møhge) was nearly a year older than her on-screen mother Karen Berg (Mrs. Fernando Møhge).
 When theater comes to town, the character "Fede" (Benny Hansen) says he prefers more well-known actors like Arthur Jensen, a celebrated Danish actor since the 1930s, who plays Mr. Schwann in this series.
 On the show, Swedish costume designer Ulla-Britt Söderlund laboured to ensure an accurate representation of the period's many changes in fashion. A very respected costumier at Nordisk Film, she had previously won an Academy Award designing the costumes for Stanley Kubrick's film Barry Lyndon.
 In one episode, the character Mads Skjern is awarded the Order of the Dannebrog for his contributions to industry. In real life, series actress Elin Reimer was awarded this chivalric order in 1984, on the back of her portrayal of Laura, the faithful servant of the Varnæs family.

Notes

References

External links 
 
 Matador Online with episode guide, character bios and more 
 Matador shooting locations 
 The Danish film database 
 Sheet music for the Matador theme by Bent Fabricius-Bjerre

1970s Danish television series
1980s Danish television series
1979 Danish television series debuts
1982 Danish television series endings
Television series set in 1929
Television series set in the 1930s
Television series set in the 1940s
DR television dramas
Danish drama television series
Danish Culture Canon
World War II television drama series
Danish-language television shows
Works by Erik Balling
Television shows set in Denmark
Works set during the Great Depression